Maasdijk may refer to:

People
 Jacob "Koos" Arnold Maasdijk (born 1968), former rower from the Netherlands

Places
Maasdijk, Hoeksche Waard, a hamlet  in the Dutch province of South Holland, part of the municipality of Hoeksche Waard
Maasdijk, Westland, a village in the Dutch province of South Holland, part of the municipality of Westland